František Draškovič (5 April 1911 – 3 June 1979) was a Slovak sculptor. His work was part of the sculpture event in the art competition at the 1936 Summer Olympics.

References

1911 births
1979 deaths
Slovak sculptors
20th-century male artists
Olympic competitors in art competitions
People from Malacky District